General Bertie may refer to:

Albemarle Bertie, 9th Earl of Lindsey (1744–1818), British Army lieutenant general
Peregrine Bertie, 3rd Duke of Ancaster and Kesteven (1714–1778), British Army general
Lord Robert Bertie (1721–1782), British Army general

See also
Mario Berti (1881–1964), Royal Italian Army lieutenant general